Bykovo is a rural locality (a selo) in Krutishinsky Selsoviet, Shelabolikhinsky District, Altai Krai, Russia. The population was 68 as of 2013. There are 4 streets.

Geography 
Bykovo is located 68 km northwest of Shelabolikha (the district's administrative centre) by road. Chaykino is the nearest rural locality.

References 

Rural localities in Shelabolikhinsky District